Mattia Furlani (born 7 February 2005) is an Italian long jumper and high jumper, his personal best 8.04 m in the long jump represents, on the eve of the 2022 World Athletics Championships in Eugene, Oregon, the 41st best senior world performance.

Biography
Son of the former high jumper Marcello Furlani (2.27 m his personal best) who is also his coach, his sister Erika (born 1996) is also a high jumper (1.94 m her personal best).

Career
In 2022 Furlani won two gold medals at the European U18 Championships, in long jump and in the high jump.

On 3 March 2023, at the age of 18, he made his debut for the national team at the European indoor championships in Istanbul.

European records
Under 20
 Long jump indoor: 7.99 m ( Stockholm, 29 January 2023) - Current holder

Achievements

References

External links
 

2005 births
Living people
Italian male long jumpers
Italian male high jumpers
Athletics competitors of Fiamme Oro